Brenda Azaria Jiménez Hernández (born December 10, 1994) is a Puerto Rican model and beauty pageant titleholder who was appointed as Miss Puerto Rico Universe 2016 on March 17, 2016, after the original titleholder, Kristhielee Caride, was dethroned of the Miss Universe Puerto Rico crown.

Early life
Jiménez was raised in Mayagüez. She studied and graduated in Biology and Psychology Honors student at the University of Puerto Rico. She wants to become a Neonatal Pediatrician in hopes of serving children to have a better quality of life.

Pageantry

Miss Universe Puerto Rico 2016
Jiménez competed in Miss Universe Puerto Rico 2016 on November 12, 2015, representing the municipality of Aguadilla, where she finished as first runner-up to Kristhielee Caride of Isabela. Four months later, on March 17, 2016, the Miss Universe Puerto Rico organization announced that Caride had been stripped of her title after failing to fulfill her obligations and, as first runner-up, Jiménez would take over the responsibilities as the new Miss Universe Puerto Rico 2016.

Miss Universe 2016
Jiménez represented Puerto Rico at Miss Universe 2016 pageant at the Mall of Asia Arena in the Philippines, Non semifinalist in Miss Universe 2016.

Miss Grand International 2017
Jiménez also represented Puerto Rico at Miss Grand International 2017 in Vietnam, where she finished third runner-up to María José Lora of Peru.

Filmography

References

Notes
 Jiménez was originally first runner-up, but became Miss Universe Puerto Rico 2016 after the original titleholder, Kristhielee Caride, was dethroned

External links
Brenda Azaria on Instagram

1994 births
Living people
People from Mayagüez, Puerto Rico
Puerto Rican beauty pageant winners
Puerto Rican female models
Miss Universe 2016 contestants
Miss Grand International contestants